Cedar Township is an inactive township in Pettis County, in the U.S. state of Missouri.

Cedar Township was so named on account of cedar bushes within its borders.

References

Townships in Missouri
Townships in Pettis County, Missouri